Ronald Forster (19 August 1935 – January 2002) was an English footballer who made 57 appearances in the Football League playing as a winger for Darlington between 1956 and 1960. He also played non-league football for clubs including Shotton Colliery Welfare.

References

1935 births
2002 deaths
Footballers from Stockton-on-Tees
Footballers from County Durham
English footballers
Association football wingers
Shotton Colliery Welfare F.C. players
Darlington F.C. players
English Football League players